Carl Tolman (May 7, 1897 – February 13, 1995) was the chancellor of Washington University in St. Louis from 1961 through 1962.

Early years
Carl Tolman was born in the Northwest Territories in Canada to American Parents. He served in the Canadian Expeditionary Force in World War I and was captured by German forces in 1917. After the war, he earned a bachelor's degree in geology from the University of British Columbia and his master's degree and Ph.D. from Yale.

Washington University
Tolman joined the faculty of Washington University in St. Louis in 1927 as an assistant professor of geology. He remained associated with the University for 68 years, eventually serving as chancellor after the retirement of Ethan A.H. Shepley.

References

External links
Washington University in St. Louis
Biographical entry at Washington University in St. Louis

1897 births
1995 deaths
Chancellors of Washington University in St. Louis
Washington University in St. Louis faculty
Scientists from St. Louis
Academic staff of the University of British Columbia
Yale University alumni